James M. Priest (July 8, 1819 – May 16, 1883) was the sixth vice president of Liberia from 1864 to 1868 under President Daniel Bashiel Warner. He was born a slave in the U.S. state of Kentucky. Prior to the death of slaveowner Jane Anderson Meaux, she educated and freed Priest and sent him to Liberia to evaluate the situation of former slaves living in Liberia. He returned to the U.S. and received more education and became a Presbyterian missionary. In 1843, he emigrated to Liberia under the auspices of the American Colonization Society.

He later became a justice of the Liberian Supreme Court.

References

1819 births
1883 deaths
19th-century American slaves
19th-century Liberian politicians
Vice presidents of Liberia
Americo-Liberian people
Supreme Court of Liberia justices
Liberian Presbyterians
American Presbyterian missionaries
Republican Party (Liberia) politicians
19th-century African-American people
19th-century Liberian judges